Ayr Central is covered shopping centre in Ayr, Scotland.

Built on a brown field site on Kyle Street, which had been abandoned for fifteen years, the development cost £75 million. It was opened ahead of schedule in March 2007, with the opening of the first Debenhams store in Ayrshire.

The shopping centre has an underground car parking facility with space for 450 cars with stairs up to the main level. A large number of shops have moved into the development, some from other locations in the town centre while others are completely new to the area such as Debenhams and Primark. There is also a café with indoor and outdoor seating areas.  Other shops in the development include Next, River Island, HMV, JD Sports, Topshop/Topman, Cherry Soda, Irepair, Subway, 
Poundland, Toytown, Costa Coffee, New Look, Holland & Barrett, Quiz, Hallmark, Ernest Jones, The Fragrance Shop, Clarks, and H&M.

In 2014, a new covered roof was added to the shopping complex, keeping the weather wash from shoppers and other passers-by.

References

External links
Ayr Central

Buildings and structures in Ayr
Shopping centres in Scotland